The Rotorschmiede VA115 is a German helicopter, designed  and produced by Rotorschmiede GmbH of Munich, introduced at the AERO Friedrichshafen airshow in 2015. The aircraft is supplied complete and ready-to-fly.

The aircraft first flew in the summer of 2015.

Design and development
The VA115 was designed to comply with the US FAR 103 Ultralight Vehicles regulations, as well as the German 120 kg class and European Class 6 microlight helicopter rules.

The VA115 features dual, coaxial main rotors with NACA 23012 airfoils, a single-seat open cockpit without a windshield, tricycle landing gear and a two-cylinder, air-cooled, two stroke, fuel-injected  Hirth F23 engine.

The aircraft fuselage is made from metal tubing, with a small cockpit fairing.

Reviewer Werner Pfaendler, described the VA115 as "beautifully engineered".

Specifications (VA115)

See also
List of rotorcraft

References

External links

VA115
2010s German sport aircraft
2010s German ultralight aircraft
2010s German helicopters
Aircraft first flown in 2015